Jaime Perales Contreras was born in Mexico City. Mexican cultural critic, public commentator and scholar. He wrote the first full-fledged biography on Nobel Award Winner for Literature Octavio Paz. (Octavio Paz y su círculo intellectual (2013), finalist XX Comillas Award for Biography and History, Barcelona, Spain.

Novelist Mario Vargas Llosa, Nobel Award Laureate, praised about Perales's book: "a mandatory reading for understanding the politics and culture of the last twenty years in the Americas of the twentieth century"

Biography

He earned his PhD in literature and cultural studies from Georgetown University, and a master's degree in International Relations from the Edmund Walsh School of Foreign Service at Georgetown University. He did his undergraduate studies in social sciences at ITAM . His previous work on Paz influenced quite a few studies on the poet's work. He worked for 12 years at the Organization of American States in the fields of Democracy and Humanitarian Security. He collaborated with different publications in Mexico, the United States and Brazil. As lecturer, he taught at the Foreign Service Institute (FSI), the school for U.S. diplomatic personnel based in Rosslyn V.A, at Georgetown University in Washington D.C, and ITAM in Mexico, City. He was a recipient of the Fulbright Program, The British Council Award Scholarship and the Consejo Nacional de Ciencia y Tecnología CONACYT

External links 
Enciclopedia de la literatura en México (fundación para las letras mexicanas, CONACULTA) http://www.elem.mx/autor/datos/4061
http://noticierostelevisa.esmas.com/cultura/590739/octavio-paz-y-circulo-intelectual/
 http://www.noticiasnet.mx/portal/literatura/cultura/175032-presentan-biograf%C3%AD-intelectual-de-paz
Entrevista a Jaime Perales Contreras sobre Octavio Paz https://www.youtube.com/watch?v=DlzD3xVYfIs
 https://www.youtube.com/watch?v=Kct8VEf_ils
Entrevista con Carlos Puig sobre la biografìa de Octavio Paz en Milenio, 14 de febrero del 2014. http://tv.milenio.com/en_15/Entrevista-Jaime-Perales_3_253804695.html
Interview with Jaime Perales Contreras on his book "Octavio Paz y su círculo intelectual" by Hola Cultura in Washington D.C  http://www.holacultura.com/2014/04/07/perales-on-octavio-paz-friends/
http://tvolucion.esmas.com/foro-tv/hora-21/218949/recuerdan-octavio-paz/
Fulbright Facebook https://www.facebook.com/COMEXUSFulbrightGR/posts/593219490697526

1963 births
Living people
Latin American studies
Georgetown University alumni
Mexican essayists
Mexican male writers
Male essayists
Literary critics of Spanish
Latin Americanists
21st-century Mexican historians
Instituto Tecnológico Autónomo de México alumni
Mexican literary historians
Writers from Mexico City
Walsh School of Foreign Service alumni